Tamil Nadu Agricultural Research Institute Ground is a multi purpose stadium in Coimbatore, Tamil Nadu. The ground is mainly used for organizing matches of football, cricket and other sports. The stadium has hosted three Ranji Trophy match  in 1965 when Madras cricket team played against Andhra cricket team. The ground hosted two more Ranji Trophy matches in 1976 when Tamil Nadu cricket team played against Andhra cricket team and again in 1990 when Tamil Nadu cricket team played against Karnataka cricket team  but since then the stadium has hosted non-first-class matches.

References

External links 

 Tamil Nadu Agricultural University
 cricketarchive
 cricinfo

Buildings and structures in Coimbatore
Cricket grounds in Tamil Nadu
Sport in Coimbatore
Defunct cricket grounds in India
Sports venues completed in 1965
1965 establishments in Madras State
University sports venues in India
Sports venues in Coimbatore
20th-century architecture in India